Durga Kumari B.K. (Nepali: दुर्गा कुमारी बि.क)  is a Nepali politician, belonging to the Communist Party of Nepal (Maoist). In the 2008 Nepalese Constituent Assembly election, she was elected from Kaski-4 constituency, winning 14866 votes. At the age of 26, she was the youngest female Assembly member elected through the First Past the Post system.

References

21st-century Nepalese women politicians
21st-century Nepalese politicians
Living people
Nepal MPs 2017–2022
Nepalese atheists
Nepal Communist Party (NCP) politicians
Communist Party of Nepal (Maoist Centre) politicians
Members of the 1st Nepalese Constituent Assembly
1982 births